Dame Janet Maureen Thornton,  (born 23 May 1949) is a senior scientist and director emeritus at the European Bioinformatics Institute (EBI), part of the European Molecular Biology Laboratory (EMBL). She is one of the world's leading researchers in structural bioinformatics, using computational methods to understand protein structure and function. She served as director of the EBI from October 2001 to June 2015, and played a key role in ELIXIR.

Education
Thornton attended Bury Grammar School until 1967, where she was head girl. After graduating in physics from the University of Nottingham, Thornton completed a master's degree in biophysics at King's College London, and a PhD in biophysics at the National Institute for Medical Research, Mill Hill, London in 1973.

Career and research
After her PhD, Thornton worked in molecular biophysics with David Chilton Phillips at the University of Oxford. In 1978, she returned to the National Institute for Medical Research, and following that took up to a Fellowship at Birkbeck College, part of the University of London. In 1990 she was appointed Professor and Director of the Biomolecular Structure and Modeling Unit in the Department of Biochemistry and Molecular Biology at University College London and later also was appointed to the Bernal Chair in the Crystallography Department at Birkbeck College.

Thornton was Director of the European Bioinformatics Institute (EBI) from 2001 to 2015, on the Wellcome Trust Genome Campus at Hinxton near Cambridge.
 She was an organiser of the Intelligent Systems for Molecular Biology (ISMB) and European Conference on Computational Biology (ECCB) joint Conference in Glasgow in 2004.

Thornton's work is highly interdisciplinary, interfacing with structural biology, bioinformatics, biological chemistry and chemoinformatics, amongst others. She was an early pioneer in structure validation for protein crystallography, developing the widely used ProCheck software. Together with Christine Orengo, she introduced the CATH classification of protein structure. Her group developed a robust enzyme classification, comparison and annotation tool – the EC-BLAST which calculates similarity between enzymes based on chemical reactions by capturing the bond change(s), reaction centre(s) or structural similarity between them.

From 2008 to 2012, she co-ordinated the four-year preparatory phase of the European life sciences data infrastructure ELIXIR. As of 2013 she remains on the ELIXIR board as one of EMBL's scientific delegates. Her research has been funded by the Medical Research Council, the Biotechnology and Biological Sciences Research Council (BBSRC), the Wellcome Trust, and the European Union.

Doctoral students and postdocs
Thornton has supervised several PhD and postdoctoral researchers including Sarah Teichmann and David Jones.

Awards and honours

Thornton was elected Fellow of the Royal Society (FRS) in 1999. She became a member of the European Molecular Biology Organisation (EMBO) in 2000, a foreign associate of the US National Academy of Sciences in 2003, and a Fellow of the Academy of Medical Sciences (FMedSci) in 2014. Thornton is a supernumerary fellow of Churchill College, Cambridge. She was elected a Fellow of the Royal Society of Chemistry (FRSC) in 2017. Thornton's nomination for the Royal Society reads 

Her citation on election to the Academy of Medical Sciences reads: 

Thornton was appointed Commander of the Order of the British Empire (CBE) in 2000 and Dame Commander of the Order of the British Empire (DBE) in the 2012 Birthday Honours for services to bioinformatics. The Times named Thornton number 86 of their "Eureka 100" British scientists in 2010. She was awarded the Suffrage Science award in 2011.

References

1949 births
Living people
Members of the European Molecular Biology Organization
Alumni of King's College London
Dames Commander of the Order of the British Empire
Female Fellows of the Royal Society
Fellows of Churchill College, Cambridge
Fellows of the International Society for Computational Biology
Fellows of the Royal Society of Chemistry
Academics of Birkbeck, University of London
Academics of University College London
British bioinformaticians
Alumni of the University of Nottingham
Foreign associates of the National Academy of Sciences
Place of birth missing (living people)
National Institute for Medical Research faculty
Fellows of the Academy of Medical Sciences (United Kingdom)
Fellows of the Royal Society
Women bioinformaticians
People educated at Bury Grammar School (Girls)